Petrushka is a stock character of Russian folk puppetry. Italian puppeteers introduced it in the first third of the 19th century. While most core characters came from Italy, they were soon transformed by the addition of material from the Russian 'lubki' and 'intermedii.'  Petrushkas are traditionally marionettes, as well as hand puppets. The character is a kind of a jester distinguished by his red dress, a red kolpak, and often a long nose.

Word origin

Although the Russian word "petrushka" has a homonym meaning "parsley", in this context the word is actually a hypocoristic (diminutive) for "Pyotr" (Пётр), which is Peter in Russian. Despite this, the character has little or nothing in common with the commedia dell'arte stock characters of Petruccio or Pierrot, but is instead a Russian version of Punch or Pulcinella.

History

Pietro-Mira Pedrillo of Italy, the court jester of the Empress Anna Ioannovna, allegedly served as a prototype for Petrushka.

Like Punch, Petrushka's voice was created with the help of a special whistle, and the dialogue was based on a momentary change of the pishchik and the "live" voice of other characters. There were a number of basic plots: the medical treatment of Petrushka, his learning of soldier’s service, the scene with his bride, and the buying of a horse and testing it.

Initially, Petrushka was characteristic of typical slapstick comedy, targeting an adult audience. As puppet theatre gradually became a predominantly children's entertainment, Petrushka became less vulgar and aggressive.  In the Soviet Union, Petrushka appeared widely in agitprop theater, defending poor peasants and attacking kulaks.

The Russian Children's Welfare Society (RCWS) hosts an annual "Petroushka Ball", which is named after a version of the Petrushka character who fell in love with a graceful ballerina.

See also 
 Guignol
 Petrushka (ballet), music by Igor Stravinsky
 Punch and Judy

References

External links 

Petrushka 
Petrushka and Vertep: On Traditions of Russian Puppet Theatre 

Fictional characters introduced in the 19th century
Puppets
Russian culture
Stock characters
Traditional dolls
Commedia dell'arte
Fictional jesters
Pulcinella
Male characters in theatre